China competed in the 2002 Asian Games held in Busan, South Korea from September 29, 2002 to October 14, 2002.

See also
 China at the Asian Games
 China at the Olympics
 Sport in China

Nations at the 2002 Asian Games
2002
Asian Games